Siebens is a surname. Notable people with the surname include:

Adalberto Siebens (born 1946), Puerto Rican boxer
Bill Siebens, Canadian oilman
Evann Siebens, Canadian artist

See also
Siebens Building, a skyscraper in Rochester, Minnesota, United States
Sieben (disambiguation)